World Game, sometimes called the World Peace Game, is an educational simulation developed by Buckminster Fuller in 1961 to help create solutions to overpopulation and the uneven distribution of global resources. This alternative to war games uses Fuller's Dymaxion map and requires a group of players to cooperatively solve a set of metaphorical scenarios, thus challenging the dominant nation-state perspective with a more holistic "total world" view. The idea was to "make the world work for 100% of humanity in the shortest possible time through spontaneous cooperation without ecological damage or disadvantage to anyone," thus increasing the quality of life for all people.

History and use
Fuller first publicly proposed the concept as the core curriculum at the (then new) Southern Illinois University Carbondale. He founded there, together with its then executive director John McHale, the World Resources Inventory, an institute responsible for conducting the research required for the game launch. Fuller proposed it in 1964 for the 1967 International and Universal Exposition in Montreal, Quebec, Canada, but the project was eventually rejected.

In a preamble to World Game documents released in 1970, Fuller identified it very closely with his 'Guinea Pig 'B' experiment' and his 'Comprehensive Anticipatory Design Science' lifework. He claimed intellectual property rights as well to control what he considered to be misapplication of his idea by others. He also claimed he had been playing it 'longhand' without the assistance of computers since 1927.
 
In 1972, the World Game Institute was founded in Philadelphia, Pennsylvania, by Fuller, Medard Gabel, Howard J. Brown and others.

In 1980, the World Game Institute and the World Resources Inventory published the World Energy Data Sheet.  The World Energy Data Sheet compiled a nation by nation summary of energy production, resources, and consumption. The information was compiled in tables and map formats. The project was researched by Seth Snyder and overseen by Medard Gabel.  The work was used during a World Game (Philadelphia, summer 1980).

By 1993, the World Game Institute developed and sold an educational software package called Global Recall, which contained global data, maps, an encyclopedia of world problems, and tools for developing solutions to world problems.  The package was a computer-based simulation game intended for use by high school and college students in learning about world problems and how to solve them.

In 2001, a for-profit educational company named o.s. Earth, Inc. purchased the principal assets of the World Game Institute and has been offering a Global Simulation Workshop that is a 'direct descendant of Buckminster Fuller's famous World Game.'

Gameplay, format and resources

References

External links
 World Game Series: Document One
 Global Simulation Workshop (Commercial)
 Buckminster Fuller Challenge
 Global Energy Network Institute
 An interview article with some statements by Bucky about The World Game

Further reading
Chu, Hsiao-Yun and Roberto Trujillo. New Views on R. Buckminster Fuller. (Stanford, CA; Stanford University Press, 2009) 

Buckminster Fuller
Peace education